Bob Lutz and Stan Smith were the defending US Open men's doubles tennis champions but lost their title after a defeat in the third round.

Fifth-seeded Ken Rosewall and Fred Stolle won the title by defeating unseeded Roy Emerson and Charlie Pasarell 2–6, 7–5, 13–11, 6–3 in the final.

Seeds

Draw

Finals

Top half

Section 1

Section 2

Bottom half

Section 3

Section 4

References

External links
 Association of Tennis professionals (ATP) results archive
1969 US Open – Men's draws and results at the International Tennis Federation

Men's Doubles
US Open (tennis) by year – Men's doubles